Eugeniusz Stasiecki codename: Piotr Pomian, Poleski, Piotr (19 February 1913 in Radom - 4 September 1944 in Warsaw, Poland) was a Polish Scoutmaster (harcmistrz), captain of the AK-Szare Szeregi.

Stasiecki died in the Warsaw Uprising at the age of 31.

Awards
 Cross of Valour (Krzyż Walecznych), twice
 Virtuti Militari, V class (15 August 1944)

1913 births
1944 deaths
People from Radom
People from Radom Governorate
20th-century Polish people
Polish Scouts and Guides
Polish Army officers
Polish resistance members of World War II
Recipients of the Silver Cross of the Virtuti Militari
Recipients of the Cross of Valour (Poland)
Resistance members killed by Nazi Germany